Torit County is an administrative region in Eastern Equatoria of South Sudan, with headquarters in the town of Torit, which is also the state capital.

Location
Torit County is located in Torit State, in southern South Sudan, close to the border with Kenya and Uganda . Torit  is one of the tens states of South Sudan known as  Eastern Equatoria state. Torit county is bordered by his neighbors county ,Lopa County to the north, Kapoeta  county to the east, Ikowot county to the east south, Magwi County to the west and Juba County in the extreme northwest. (See map to the right).

The coordinates of Torit County are: 4° 30' 0.00"N, 32° 30' 0.00"E (Latitude: 4.5000; Longitude: 32.5000).

Overview
Torit County was earlier split into 8 payams. The payams that constitute Torit County include the following:

 Bur Payam
 Ifwotu Payam
 Kudo Payam
 Hiyala Payam
 Himodonge Payam
 Imurok Payam
 Nyong Payam
 Iyire Payam

The town of Torit is the headquarters of Torit County, one of the eleven counties which make up Torit State. Torit is also the capital of Torit State, one of the twenty-eight states which constitute the Republic of South Sudan. The Imatong Mountains lie partly in the southern part of Torit County. In April 2016, the county was divided into 3 counties, with 2 new counties of Torit East and Torit West being carved out of the county.

History
Torit County was formed in 1934 by the merging of the districts of Teretenya and Opari. Opari was the district administrative headquarters for the regions inhabited by the Lotuko (Otuho), Madi and Acholi ethnic groups. Torit county was adversely affected by both the Second Sudanese Civil War and by the activities of the Lord's Resistance Army. As late as 2006, a significant portion of its population was still internally displaced within South Sudan.

Population
The 2008 Sudanese census estimated the population of Torit County at approximately 99,740 Although these results were disputed by the South Sudanese authorities, they are the only recent figures available and form a basis on which newer studies can be based.

In April 2016, the state was divided into 3 counties with 2 new counties called Torit East and Torit West being carved out of it.

See also
 Torit
 Torit Airport
 Eastern Equatoria
 Equatoria

References

External links
The Counties of South Sudan - Map
The States of South Sudan - Map

Counties of Eastern Equatoria